Via Ferrata Loen is a climbing trail based on the Italian concept of via ferrata to the mountain Hoven (1011 masl), in Stryn, Western Norway. It was opened in 2012 and since then, new content has been added.
Via Ferrata Loen has a degree of difficulty from A to D. From 900 masl there is a common path to the top of the mountain Hoven. Loen Skylift also goes to the top of Hoven.
Climbing areas of Norway
Climbing routes